Forgotten Melody for a Flute is a 1987 Russian comedy film directed by Eldar Ryazanov. The film's plot is based on the stage play of the same name written by Ryazanov and Emil Braginsky.

Plot 
It tells the story of a former musician who must make a hard choice between freedom with his mistress and a comfortable life with his wife. Previously, he was a student of a conservatory and a good flute player and now is the husband of an important man's daughter. Himself he is the head of one of the units of the Main Directorate. One day Leonid Semenovich Filimonov feels a physical discomfort; his heart aches, and he is not even forty years old. This unpleasant incident provides an opportunity to get acquainted with Lida – a young nurse from the departmental clinic which becomes a start of a whirlwind romance.

Cast 
 Leonid Filatov - Leonid Filimonov
 Tatyana Dogileva - Lida
 Irina Kupchenko - Yelena
 Valentin Gaft - Odinokov
 Vsevolod Sanayev - Yaroslav Stepanovich
 Olga Volkova - Surova
 Sergei Artsybashev - Aleksey Akimovich
 Alexander Shirvindt - Myasoedov
 Elena Mayorova - Lusya, a policeman
 Vaclav Dvorzhetsky — Leonid Filimonov's father
 Elena Fadeeva — Leonid Filimonov's mother
 Aleksandr Pankratov-Chyorny — Sacha, actor
 Petr Merkuryev — conductor of female choir
 Eugene Voskresensky — Kirill, Surova's nephew
 Alexander Samoylenko — Sacha, Kirill's partner in crime
 Nina Agapova — Tatyana Georgievna, secretary
 Tatyana Gavrilova — actress, (Mayor's wife)
 Capitolina Ilienko — Capitolina Ivanovna
 Leonid Maryagin — Fedor Demyanovich, Filimonov's father in law
 Valery Pogoreltsev — director of amateur theatre
 Yuri Suchkov — actor (Khlestakov)
 Alexander Pyatkov — bureaucrat on the train
 Eldar Ryazanov — man with telescope

External links 

1987 comedy films
1987 films
Soviet comedy films
Russian comedy films
Mosfilm films
Films directed by Eldar Ryazanov
Films scored by Andrey Petrov